This article is a list of historic places in Halifax, Nova Scotia listed on the Canadian Register of Historic Places, all of which are designated as historic places either locally, provincially, federally or by more than one level of government. References to municipalities in the chart are to communities located within Halifax.

For historic places located elsewhere in Nova Scotia, see the List of historic places in Nova Scotia.

List of historic places

See also

History of Nova Scotia
History of the Halifax Regional Municipality
List of National Historic Sites of Canada in Nova Scotia
 List of oldest buildings and structures in Halifax, Nova Scotia

References

Halifax
History of Halifax, Nova Scotia

Historic